The velvet catshark (Parmaturus lanatus) is a deepwater catshark. It is known only from a single specimen collected off the Tanimbar Islands in the Arafura Sea, Indonesia, at a  depth.

Distribution
The shark is found in the Western Pacific.

References

velvet catshark
fish of Indonesia
velvet catshark